The signifying monkey is a character of African-American folklore that derives from the trickster figure of Yoruba mythology, Esu Elegbara. This character was transported with Africans to the Americas under the names of Exu, Echu-Elegua, Papa Legba, and Papa Le Bas. Esu and his variants all serve as messengers who mediated between the gods and men by means of tricks. The signifying monkey is "distinctly Afro-American" but is thought to derive from Yoruban mythology, which depicts Echu-Elegua with a monkey at his side.

Numerous songs and narratives concern the signifying monkey and his interactions with his friends, the lion and the elephant. In general, the stories depict the signifying monkey insulting the lion, but claiming that he is only repeating the elephant's words. The lion then confronts the elephant, who in turn physically assaults the lion. The lion later realizes that the monkey has been signifyin' and has duped the lion, and as a result the lion angrily returns to castrate the monkey and renders him unable to reproduce.

In popular culture

The signifying monkey appears in the following:
 "The Jungle King (You Ain't Done a Doggone Thing)", a 1947 song by Cab Calloway and Mort Dixon (also recorded by Willie Dixon as "Signifying Monkey")
 "Straighten Up And Fly Right", a song written by Nat King Cole and Irving Mills and one of the first vocal hits for the King Cole Trio
 "The Signifying Monkey", a song by Smokey Joe Baugh, released by Sun Records as a 7" single in 1955
 "Jo Jo Gunne", a 1958 song by Chuck Berry
 "The Signifying Monkey", a song by Oscar Brown from the 1960 album Sin & Soul... and Then Some
 "Signifyin' Monkey", performed by Johnny Otis and his band from the 1968 album Cold Shot
 "The Signifying Monkey", a comedy routine by Rudy Ray Moore, from the 1971 album This Pussy Belongs To Me
 "King Monkey Rapp", a 1980 song by King Monkey (Jimmy Thompson).
 "Signifying Rapper", a 1988 song by Schoolly D
 "The Signifying Monkey", a song by Sam the Sham from the 1993 album The Wooly Bully Years
In the 2003 Angel episode "Destiny", the vampire Spike uses a variation of the phrase to mock Angel for believing he was the subject of a prophecy which might just as easily have referred to Spike: "All these years believing you're the signified monkey, only to find out you're just a big hunk of nobody cares."

It was referenced and can also be heard in the 1990 movie House Party.  The father played by Robin Harris mentioned the character Dolomite to his son Kid.  He is disappointed that Kid would rather go to a party than stay home with his dad and watch the show.  The dad then starts reciting the Signifying Monkey routine as he walks away.  The routine can also be heard as the dad has fallen asleep and Kid sneaks out the door (having been now grounded for an incident at school) to attend the party.

In the 1981 George A. Romero film Knightriders, the following is sung at a post-tournament campfire gathering:

References

American folklore
African-American cultural history
Mythological tricksters
Mythological monkeys